Teredina is an extinct genus of fossil bivalve mollusc that lived from the Late Cretaceous to the late Pliocene in Asia, Europe, and North America.

Teredina shells consist of 2 short, hooked valves with a pair of furrows and each valve with transverse ridges. The overall body was long and clud-shaped. Teredina used the ridges on each valve to bore into drift wood by rocking back and forth; its long body shape allowed for large intestines for it to carry bacteria capable of breaking down the cellulose in the wood. Petrified drift wood with Teridina burrows can be found in the Cretaceous rocks of Vancouver Island.

References

 Fossils (Smithsonian Handbooks) by David Ward (Page 111)

Prehistoric bivalve genera
Cretaceous bivalves
Paleocene bivalves
Eocene bivalves
Oligocene molluscs
Miocene molluscs
Pliocene molluscs
Prehistoric animals of Asia
Prehistoric molluscs of Europe
Prehistoric bivalves of North America
Myida